Carlos López del Rey (born 1980), known professionally as Carlos Vermut, is a Spanish filmmaker. Born in Madrid, he worked as illustrator, comic book artist and storyboard designer prior to filmmaking. Following his involvement in the animated television series Jelly Jamm, he made his feature film debut with Diamond Flash. His sophomore feature Magical Girl (2014) earned critical acclaim. He has since directed and written Quién te cantará (2018) and Manticore (2022), as well as penned the script of The Grandmother (2021).

Works 
Feature films

Accolades

References 

1980 births
Spanish film directors
Spanish male screenwriters
Living people
People from Madrid
21st-century Spanish screenwriters
Film poster artists